Christopher Michael Hulvey (born January 13, 1999), known professionally by his surname Hulvey, is an American Christian rapper, singer, songwriter, and record producer. His debut studio album Christopher debuted and peaked at no.8 on the Billboard Top Christian Albums chart.

Musical career 
Hulvey was born and raised in Brunswick, Georgia. He dropped out of college and moved to Atlanta to pursue a career in music. He supported his music aspirations by working at a local supermarket where his job responsibilities included "scrubbing toilets [and] cleaning floors." In August 2019, Hulvey signed a contract with Reach Records which was made public in January 2020. His first release with the label was an EP titled Prelude then a month later he followed up with another EP titled BRKNHRT.

In addition to his solo work, Hulvey was featured on two songs ("Restored" and "Celebrate More") from Lecrae's album Restoration and also received writing credits for two additional songs on the album ("Set Me Free" and "Over the Top"). Hulvey was also featured on the 116 Clique song "Live Forever" (which recently passed 1 million views on YouTube)  and on Jordan Feliz's song "Glorify" alongside his labelmate Lecrae. Lastly, Hulvey was the opening act during the Social Club Misfits tour in early 2020.

In 2021, his debut album Christopher landed at No. #8 on Billboard Top Christian/Gospel Albums chart, #19 at Rap Albums chart, only one week after its release. That same year, he released an eight track EP titled COMA. The following year, he released a standalone single "Beautiful".

In 2023, he was featured in a song with Forrest Frank of Surfaces called "No Longer Bound". The song reached #2 on the U.S. Viral 50 Chart on Spotify and #19 on the Billboard Hot Christian Songs.

Discography

Extended plays 
 Prelude (2020)
 BRKNHRT. (2020) 
 COMA (2021)

Studio albums

 Christopher (2021)

References 

Reach Records artists
1999 births
Living people